John Patrick Kilbane (April 9, 1889 – May 31, 1957) was an American featherweight boxer in the early part of the 20th century. He held the World Featherweight title from 1912 to 1923, the longest period in the division's history, having defended the title against four contenders during the reign. Statistical boxing website BoxRec lists Kilbane as the No. 2 ranked featherweight of all-time, while The Ring Magazine founder Nat Fleischer placed him at No. 5. The International Boxing Research Organization rates Kilbane as the 8th best featherweight ever. He was inducted into the Ring Magazine Hall of Fame in 1960 and the International Boxing Hall of Fame in 1995.

Early life
Kilbane was born to John and Mary (Gallagher) Kilbane in Cleveland, Ohio on April 9, 1889. His mother died when he was 3 years old and his father went blind when he was 6. He attended school until the sixth grade when he dropped out to help support his family.

Career

Kilbane's first professional fight was in 1907, for which he earned around $25.

World featherweight champion

On February 22, 1912, Kilbane took the featherweight title from Abe Atell in a twenty-round match in Vernon, California.  When he returned to Cleveland, on St. Patrick's Day, he was given the greatest welcome ever given to a native Clevelander, with more than 100,000 people turning out. He  held the featherweight championship for 11 years through numerous fights.  He finally lost it to Eugene Criqui. The high number of "no decision"s in his career reflected early boxing rules in many states in the U.S. that dictated "no decision"—ND—unless a fight ended by knockout.

Kilbane fought 1904 World Bantamweight champion Jimmy Walsh in a World Featherweight Title match on May 21, 1912, at the Pilgrim Athletic Club in Boston, Massachusetts to a twelve-round draw decision. They had previously fought in a non-title match on May 30, 1911, in a 12-round draw bout in Canton, Ohio, that was characterized as "full of clinches", with neither man "doing much hard work."

In October 1917 - while still World Featherweight Champion - Kilbane became a lieutenant in the U.S. Army — assigned to Camp Sherman located near Chillicothe, Ohio — training U.S. soldiers in self-defense during World War I.

After losing the featherweight title in 1923, Kilbane won at least two exhibition bouts, and then retired from boxing.

Life after boxing

Kilbane would referee boxing matches after retiring from boxing, as well as operating a gym, serving in the Ohio Senate and acting as Clerk of the Cleveland Municipal Court.

Kilbane was such a popular prizefighter in his day that his name appeared in print as a verb. An unsigned commentary in the sports pages of the New York Times on May 16, 1912, reported on an episode involving Detroit baseball player Ty Cobb, who the day before, in a game between the Detroit Tigers and the New York Yankees, had gone into the stands after a heckler.  The commentary said, "The famous baseball player from Detroit, Ty Cobb chased after a heckler during a game with the New York Yankees and 'Johnny Kilbaned' him right where he stood...and in so doing stopped the profane and intolerable language dead in its tracks, along with the heckler himself".
Kilbane was a distant relative of the Irish boxer John Joe Nevin, the footballer Darren Fletcher, the wrestler Giant Haystacks and the Irish footballer Kevin Kilbane. His family was originally from Achill, County Mayo, Ireland.

He died on May 31, 1957, in Cleveland, Ohio.

Awards and honors
12-year reign as World Featherweight Champion
1995: International Boxing Hall of Fame inductee
2012: Street where Kilbane grew up in Cleveland (Herman Avenue) was renamed Kilbane Town and 
2012: Statue on Achill Island, Mayo, Ireland from where his parents emigrated. 
2014: Statue in Cleveland's Battery Park neighborhood.

Professional boxing record
All information in this section is derived from BoxRec, unless otherwise stated.

Official record

All newspaper decisions are officially regarded as “no decision” bouts and are not counted in the win/loss/draw column.

Unofficial record

Record with the inclusion of newspaper decisions in the win/loss/draw column.

References

External links

Johnny Kilbane at Flickr Commons
Johnny Kilbane

|-

  

|-

1889 births
1957 deaths
Boxers from Cleveland
Featherweight boxers
World boxing champions
American male boxers